The 1981 League of Ireland Cup Final was the final match of the 1980–81 League of Ireland Cup, a knock-out association football competition played annually by clubs affiliated with the League of Ireland. It was contested by Dundalk and Galway Rovers, and took place across two legs – with the first leg being played on 1 January 1981 at Terryland Park in Galway, and the second leg being played on 8 January 1981 at Oriel Park in Dundalk. Both legs finished scoreless and Dundalk subsequently won a penalty shoot-out to win the trophy for a second time.

Background
The League Cup was the first trophy of the 1980–81 League of Ireland season. The two sides had met once previously that season in the League in a 1–1 draw. Dundalk had last won the competition in 1978 – their first win in the competition. They reached the final by defeating Home Farm (2–0), St Patrick's Athletic (2–0) and Drogheda United (5–0).

Galway Rovers were appearing in their first domestic final, having entered the League of Ireland in 1977–78.

Match

Summary
The first leg in Galway was marked by an injury to Galway goalkeeper, Tom Lally, in the 52nd minute. Galway elected to continue with the injured player in goals, and Dundalk subsequently failed to seriously challenge him, particularly as they then lost forward Mick Fairclough to injury a minute later. Prior to that, Dundalk had dominated the first half and hit the post through Jerome Clarke just before half-time. But, despite the injury to Lally, they appeared happy to settle for the draw, which made them favourites going into the second leg.

The second leg in Oriel Park saw Dundalk dominate again as expected, with the Galway goalmouth being described as "resembling a very crowded Eyre Square". Goalkeeper Lally, recovered from his injury the week before, had to make a number of saves to keep Dundalk out. His opposite number, Richie Blackmore, meanwhile, had little to do – as Galway's players were forced into defending on the edge of their own penalty area. In extra-time Dundalk continued to dominate possession, but could only fashion one chance, which again was saved by Lally. In the subsequent penalty shoot-out Dundalk missed two of their five penalties, while Galway missed two of their first four, leaving Lally to take their final kick to send the shoot-out to sudden-death. His penalty was saved by Blackmore, and Dundalk had won the League of Ireland Cup for the second time. They would go on to win the FAI Cup as well, later that season.

First leg details

Second leg details

References
Bibliography

Citations

League of Ireland Cup finals
League Of Ireland Cup Final 1981
League Of Ireland Cup Final